Osmiro de Souza Silva (born October 9, 1961 in Itapaci) is a retired long-distance runner from Brazil, who represented his native country in the men's marathon at the 1992 and at the 2000 Summer Olympics. He won the Lisbon Marathon in 1988 and the 1991 edition of the Marrakesh Marathon.

Achievements
All results regarding marathon, unless stated otherwise

References

External links
 
All Athletics profile

1961 births
Living people
Brazilian male long-distance runners
Athletes (track and field) at the 1992 Summer Olympics
Athletes (track and field) at the 2000 Summer Olympics
Olympic athletes of Brazil